Doing Time for Patsy Cline is a 1997 Australian film starring Miranda Otto, Richard Roxburgh, and Matt Day, and directed by Chris Kennedy.

Plot

Following a passion for country music, Ralph leaves his father's sheep farm in a remote Australian town, armed with a guitar and a plane ticket to Nashville, Tennessee.  He hopes to hitchhike to Sydney Airport where his take-off into a successful country/western singing career will hopefully begin.  

However, fate and his naivety find him hitchhiking with a psychotic drug thief named Boyd, and Boyd's mesmerising girlfriend, Patsy. The plot then splits into a series of parallels, flash forwards and flashbacks. One depicts Ralph's imprisonment after being framed for drug trafficking.  The other follows the dramatic ascent of his career to hype status and the pairing between the dynamic Patsy and himself. Both paths eventually lead him home, with Ralph consequently being more mature and adjusted, and with a bag full of experiences. At the end of the film, it is stated that Patsy dies in a plane crash.

Cast

Reception

Box office
Doing Time for Patsy Cline grossed $671,639 at the box office in Australia, which is equivalent to £710,760.53 British pounds or $940,295 dollars, in 2009.

Reviews
The film received generally positive reviews.  The New York Times criticized the film's editing and "jarring leaps in time", but praised the film's performances, especially that of Roxburgh.

Awards
The film received many award nominations including ten AFI Award nominations for 1997. It won an Australian Writer's Guild Award for Best Original Screenplay. The film won four Australian Film Institute Awards including Best Actor, Best Cinematography, Best Original Music Score, and Best Costume Design. It also won an award of distinction for production design. It won three Australian Film Critics' Awards, including Best Actor, Best Musical Score and Best Cinematography. It also won a San Diego Film Festival Award for Best Original Script and a Melbourne International Film Festival Award for Most Popular Australian Film.

See also
 Patsy Cline

References

External links

Doing Time for Patsy Cline at Oz Movies

Doing Time for Patsy Cline at the Oz Film Database
Doing Time for Patsy Cline at The New York Times

1997 films
Australian drama films
1997 drama films
Films scored by Peter Best (composer)
1990s English-language films